She Didn't Say No! is a 1958 British comedy film directed by Cyril Frankel and starring Eileen Herlie, Perlita Neilson and Niall MacGinnis. Based on the 1955 novel We Are Seven by Una Troy, an attractive young Irishwoman has six children from five different fathers.

Plot
In a little Irish town the authorities apply for a court order to remove the unmarried Bridget Monaghan's six children, who have five different fathers. When the judge disagrees, finding them to be a happy and united family, the doctor convenes a meeting of the surviving fathers (one has died) at which, after long discussion, they agree on a plan. To remove the scandal, they will buy the Monaghans a farm over 150 kilometres away.

Negotiations will be conducted by Casey, unmarried father of the eldest Monaghan boy, whom he takes to work on his own farm. The eldest Monaghan girl falls in love with a visiting painter, who wants to take her to Italy. The next Monaghan girl catches the eye of a visiting film director, who wants to take her to London. The youngest Monaghan boy wins the heart of his father's childless wife, who wants to adopt him. Two children are left when Casey is ready to move the family to their new home and, to remove scandal, he marries their mother.

Cast
 Eileen Herlie as Bridget Monahan
 Perlita Neilson as Mary Monahan
 Wilfred Downing as Tommy Monahan
 Anne Dickins as Poppy Monahan
 Teri Scoble as 	Twin #2
 Lesley Scoble as Twin #1
 Raymond Manthorpe as Toughy Monahan
 Niall MacGinnis as James Casey
 Patrick McAlinney as Matthew Hogan
 Jack MacGowran as William Bates
 Joan O'Hara as Mrs. Bates
 Ray McAnally as Jim Power
 Betty McDowall as Mrs. Power
 Ian Bannen as Peter Howard
 Eithne Dunne as Miss Hogan
 Hilton Edwards as Film Director
 Maureen Halligan as Miss Kelly
 Harry Hutchinson as Judge
 Paul Farrell as Darmody
 Shirley Joy as Maybella Merton
 Viola Keats as Mrs. Merton
 Anna Manahan as Maggie Murphy
 Michael O'Brien as Sergeant
 Liam Redmond as Dr. Cassidy
 John Welsh as Inspector

Production
It was shot at Elstree Studios and in Cornwall, using Technicolor. The film's sets were designed by the art director William Kellner.

References

Bibliography
 Halliwell, Leslie. Halliwell's Film Guide. HarperPerennial, 1994.

External links
 

1958 films
1958 comedy films
British comedy films
Films set in Ireland
Films based on Irish novels
Films directed by Cyril Frankel
Films shot at Associated British Studios
1950s English-language films
1950s British films